Juan Carlos Valerón Santana (born 17 June 1975) is a Spanish retired footballer who played as an attacking midfielder, currently a manager.

Over 15 seasons, he amassed La Liga totals of 390 matches and 29 goals in representation of Mallorca, Atlético Madrid and Deportivo, spending 13 years with the latter club. He started and finished his 22-year senior career with Las Palmas.

Valerón represented Spain in the 2002 World Cup and two European Championships, earning 46 caps.

Playing career

Club

Early years
Born in Arguineguín, Gran Canaria, Valerón started playing with hometown's UD Las Palmas, but switched to the Balearic Islands in the 1997–98 season, representing RCD Mallorca and making his La Liga debut on 31 August 1997 by playing ten minutes in a 2–1 home win over Valencia CF.

He was an instrumental figure in the club's qualification for the UEFA Cup Winners' Cup, with the team also finishing fifth in the league and reaching the final of the Copa del Rey, lost to eventual champions FC Barcelona in a penalty shoot-out.

Atlético and Deportivo
In the next two years, Valerón played for Atlético Madrid where he was an undisputed starter but, following the side's relegation in 2000, he joined Deportivo de La Coruña, sharing club and position with equally talented Brazilian Djalminha. He gradually would become first choice, signing a contract to eventually see off the remainder of his career with the Galicians in February 2004.

In January 2006, however, Valerón started a bad run with injuries. He suffered a knee injury which relapsed in July and early 2007 (with him only managing two league appearances in the process), leading to another surgery. Consequently, he did not reappear until midway through the 2007–08 campaign.

On 27 January 2008, Valerón returned to the bench in Deportivo's 3–1 home win against Real Valladolid, coming on as a substitute for Andrés Guardado for the final 15 minutes – his first match for over a year. In 2008–09, aged 33, he eventually became an important first-team fixture again, both on domestic and European fronts.

The 36-year-old Valerón was an undisputed starter for Depor in the 2011–12 season, scoring a career-best five goals in nearly 3,000 minutes of action in Segunda División as his team returned to the top flight after one year out, as champions. Even though he had a contract until 2015, he chose to leave in June 2013, having taken part in 422 games all competitions comprised (32 goals).

Return to Las Palmas
On 14 July 2013, following another Deportivo relegation, Valerón returned to his first club Las Palmas after 16 years, signing a one-year contract with an option for a second. He continued to be an important first-team member during his tenure, achieving promotion to the top flight in 2015.

In summer 2015, Valerón renewed his contract with the Amarillos for a further year. On 26 September, he first appeared with the club in the top flight, featuring 22 minutes in a 1–2 away loss to Barcelona in what was his first game in the competition in 847 days, and becoming the fifth oldest player to play there at the age of 40 years and 101 days; he climbed one position on 12 December after coming on as substitute against Real Betis, surpassing former Deportivo teammate Donato.

On 1 March 2016, after being featured in a 4–0 home win against Getafe CF, Valerón appeared in his 400th game in the Spanish top tier. On 7 May, he announced his retirement.

International
A Spain international since 18 November 1998 in a 2–2 friendly draw with Italy in Salerno, Valerón appeared with the national side at UEFA Euro 2000, the 2002 FIFA World Cup (where he scored in a 3–1 win against Slovenia) and Euro 2004, netting immediately after coming from the bench in a 1–0 victory over Russia in the latter competition.

He made his last appearance for his country on 26 March 2005, a 3–0 defeat of China. In late July 2019, he was hired by the Canarian Football Federation to be responsible for the several teams in the region that took part in the corresponding competitions.

Coaching career
Shortly after retiring, Valerón began working as a manager after completing the UEFA B course. He was appointed youth coach at Las Palmas and, ahead of the 2017–18 season, was named assistant to Manolo Márquez in the first team; the latter left his position three months later, however, and the former returned to the academy.

On 24 January 2018, Valerón agreed to join Juan Manuel Rodríguez's staff at UD Las Palmas Atlético, the reserve team. He resigned from his post in June due to personal reasons, but the following January resumed his work with the youth sides.

Valerón returned to his former club Deportivo in June 2020, being appointed manager of the reserves in Tercera División.

Player profile

Style of play
A talented and creative attacking midfielder with an eye for goal, Valerón was known for his vision and technical abilities, especially his passing skills and ball control, but was also injury-prone and inconsistent.

Reception

Valerón was widely regarded as one of the most respected players in Spain, and as an important figure for Deportivo. Andrés Iniesta said he would pay to watch him play, whilst manager Juan Antonio Anquela called him a reference for Spanish football and fellow coach Vicente del Bosque admitted that he would always fit in the national team. His Las Palmas teammate, Javi Castellano, praised him for his honesty and modesty.

Miguel Ángel Ramírez, Las Palmas president, said in 2015 he was trying to persuade Valerón to play another season so that he would be able to say goodbye to all the stadia in Spain where he was consistently cheered– this was exemplified by his last game at the Camp Nou, with former national teammate Luis Enrique and coach of the opposing team applauding as he took the pitch. Former Dutch internationals Jimmy Floyd Hasselbaink and Roy Makaay claimed he was the best player they had ever played with.

Ahead of his return to the Estadio Riazor in April 2016, Deportivo manager Víctor Sánchez said that Valerón would have won the Ballon d'Or had he played for a more fashionable club.

Personal life
Valerón's older brother, Miguel Ángel, was also a footballer and a midfielder; having represented Las Palmas and Mallorca B, his career was also curtailed by injuries. Later, together with another sibling, Pedro, they created a football club/school named Abrisajac, from biblical characters Abraham, Isaac and Jacob, and Juan Carlos still played there one year before retiring for good.

Valerón was a close friend of fellow Canarian Manuel Pablo, who also played for Las Palmas, Deportivo and Spain. He was also known for his devotion to God, but admitted that he and his family did not follow any religion.

Valerón's nephew, Manu, also played youth football for Las Palmas.

Career statistics

Club
Sources:

International
Appearances and goals by national team and year

International goals

Honours
Deportivo
Copa del Rey: 2001–02
Supercopa de España: 2002
UEFA Intertoto Cup: 2008
Segunda División: 2011–12

Spain U21
UEFA European Under-21 Championship: 1998

Individual
LFP Awards Fair Play: 2008–09
Diario AS Fair Play: 2015

See also
List of La Liga players (400+ appearances)

References

External links

1975 births
Living people
People from Mogán
Sportspeople from the Province of Las Palmas
Spanish deists
Spanish footballers
Footballers from the Canary Islands
Association football midfielders
La Liga players
Segunda División players
Segunda División B players
Tercera División players
Divisiones Regionales de Fútbol players
UD Las Palmas Atlético players
UD Las Palmas players
RCD Mallorca players
Atlético Madrid footballers
Deportivo de La Coruña players
Spain under-21 international footballers
Spain under-23 international footballers
Spain international footballers
UEFA Euro 2000 players
2002 FIFA World Cup players
UEFA Euro 2004 players
Spanish football managers
Tercera División managers